Peltocalathos is a monotypic genus of flowering plants belonging to the family Ranunculaceae. The only species is Peltocalathos baurii.

Its native range is Southern Africa.

References

Ranunculaceae
Ranunculaceae genera
Monotypic Ranunculales genera